Staffel is a mountain in Bavaria, Germany. It is part of the Bavarian Prealps.

Mountains of Bavaria
Mountains of the Alps